Creeksea is a village and former civil parish, now in the parish of Burnham-on-Crouch, in the Maldon district, in the county of Essex, England. It is on the Dengie peninsula on the north side of the River Crouch, one mile west of Burnham-on-Crouch.  In 1931 the parish had a population of 76.

History

Royal Air Force fast rescue boats and a Royal Navy motor torpedo boat flotilla operated from Creeksea during World War II.

Creeksea Place Manor, a large red brick house built c. 1569 by Sir Arthur Harris stands in the village.

Many variations of Creeksea are found in old documents including Cricksea, Crykseye and Crixsey.

On 1 April 1934 the parish was abolished and merged with Burnham, part also went to Canewdon.

Port
Navigation on the River Crouch at Creeksea is governed by the Crouch Harbour Authority. There are 2 berths at Creeksea operated by Baltic Wharves,

Local amenities

Established in 1957, Creeksea Sailing Club has launching facilities on the River Crouch. The local public house is the Greyhound. There is a golf course in the village.

Religious sites

The local church is All Saints, in the Diocese of Chelmsford. The church was built in the 14th century and then rebuilt in 1878.

References

External links
Information and photographs of Creeksea
The history of Creeksea

Villages in Essex
Ports and harbours of Essex
Former civil parishes in Essex
Burnham-on-Crouch